Pierre Petit (born 27 September 1957 in Guéret) is a French racing driver. In 1982 he won the French Formula Three Championship.  In 1995 he finished third at 24 Hours of Le Mans in the LMP2 class.

References

1957 births
Living people
French racing drivers
French Formula Three Championship drivers
24 Hours of Le Mans drivers
European Formula Two Championship drivers
People from Guéret
Sportspeople from Creuse

David Price Racing drivers